Island Son is an American medical drama television series that aired on CBS from September 16, 1989, to March 15, 1990, during the 1989–90 schedule.

Island Son marked the return to regular weekly series television of Richard Chamberlain, who had not so appeared since his Dr. Kildare series almost 25 years earlier. In the interim he had enjoyed a somewhat successful career in feature films, and had become widely known as "The King of the Miniseries" due to his success in that format.

Premise
Chamberlain once again portrayed a dedicated medical doctor, Dr. Daniel Kulani. Kulani was born in Hawaii and practiced on the mainland for many years prior to his return to work at the fictional Kamehameha Medical Center in Honolulu. Kulani's complicated life involved his stressful work environment; his adoptive parents, Tutu and Nana; his 18-year-old son, Sam; and his love interest, high school drama teacher Nina Delaney. Dr. Kulani's complicated life was never resolved to the satisfaction of the viewers because the program was canceled in March 1990.

Cast
Richard Chamberlin as Dr. Daniel Kulani 
Brynn Thayer as Dr. Margaret Judd
Clyde Kusatsu as Dr. Kenji Fushida
Carol Huston as Dr. Caitlin McGrath 
Timothy Carhart as Dr. Anthony Metzger
Betty Carvalho as Nana Kulani
William McNamara as Sam

Episodes

References

External links
 

CBS original programming
1980s American drama television series
1990s American drama television series
1989 American television series debuts
1990 American television series endings
1980s American medical television series
1990s American medical television series
Television series by Warner Bros. Television Studios
English-language television shows
Television shows set in Hawaii
Television shows filmed in Hawaii